Bedros Magakyan (1826–1891), was an Ottoman-Armenian actor and theater director. He was the founder of the Armenian Oriental Theater.

Life

Bedros Magakyan founded a theater with actors of Armenian descent inspired by Europe and with permission from Sultan Abdülmecid I. The theater was founded in 1857 and originally performed classical European plays such as the works of Shakespeare.

References 

 Raşit Çavaş, Bedros Magakyan, Dünden Bugüne İstanbul Ansiklopedisi, c. 5, s. 238, 1994. .

1826 births
1891 deaths
19th-century male actors from the Ottoman Empire
Ethnic Armenian male actors
Male stage actors from the Ottoman Empire
Armenians from the Ottoman Empire
19th-century Armenian people
Theatre directors from the Ottoman Empire